Imidazolidine is a heterocyclic compound (CH2)2(NH)2CH2. The parent imidazolidine is lightly studied, but related compounds substituted on one or both nitrogen centers are more common.  Generally, they are colorless, polar, basic compounds.  Imidazolidines are cyclic 5-membered examples of the general class of aminals.

Preparation
Imidazolidines are traditionally prepared by condensation reaction of 1,2-diamines and aldehydes.  Most commonly, one or both nitrogen center is substituted with an alkyl or benzyl (Bn) group: 
(CH2NBn)2  +  PhCHO   →   (CH2NBn)2C(H)Ph  +  H2O
The first unsubstituted imidazolidine synthesis was reported in 1952.

Reactions
Unsubstituted imidazolidines are often labile. The rings are susceptible to hydrolysis back to the diamine and the aldehyde.

Formally, removal of the two hydrogens at carbon 2 (between the two nitrogens) would yield the carbene dihydroimidazol-2-ylidene. Derivatives of the latter comprise an important class of persistent carbenes.

Related imidazole-derived heterocycles
Classified as a diamine, it is formally derived by the addition of four hydrogen atoms to imidazole. The intermediate, resulting from the addition of only two hydrogen atoms is called imidazoline (dihydroimidazole). The connection of imidazolidine to related compounds is indicated in the Figure.

References